Anisoxya is a genus of beetles belonging to the family Melandryidae.

The genus was first described by Mulsant in 1856.

Species:
 Anisoxya fuscula (Illiger, 1798)
 Anisoxya glaucula LeConte, 1866

References

Melandryidae